James Troisi (born 3 July 1988) is an Australian professional soccer player who plays as an attacking midfielder or winger for Western United.

Early life
Troisi was born in Rose Park, a suburb of Adelaide, South Australia, to Greek parents. His stepfather is Italian.

He signed his first professional contract with Newcastle United on 10 January 2007, keeping him at the club until June 2008. He did not make a first team appearance during his time at Newcastle, although he did feature on the bench for the first team in both Premier League and UEFA Cup matches.

Club career

Newcastle United
He was on the fringes of Newcastle's senior side for the 2007–08 Premier League season and showed promising signs in pre-season friendlies, including getting two assists against Hartlepool United.

In January 2008, Troisi had a two match trial with Dutch Eredivisie club, Roda JC. Roda wanted to sign him on a permanent basis, but negotiations broke down as Troisi was a product of Newcastle's youth development and still under 23 years of age, so Newcastle would have required a compensation fee.

On 6 May 2008, it was announced that Troisi would leave Newcastle United after the end of the 2007–08 season.

Gençlerbirliği
He joined Gençlerbirliği at the end of August 2008 on a three-year contract. He made his debut for Gençlerbirliği S.K. on 14 September 2008 against Eskisehirspor at the 19 Mayis Stadium in Ankara, coming on as a 65th-minute substitute for Engin Baytar.

Kayserispor

On 24 January, Troisi put mid-table Kayserispor to the sword with his first career hat-trick scoring all of Genclerbirligi goals in a 3–1 win.

In July 2009, he joined Kayserispor on a four-year contract.

Atalanta
On 22 August 2012 Juventus signed him as free agent on a four-year contract, but half of the registration rights were sold to Atalanta for €2 million as part of Manolo Gabbiadini's deal on 24 August 2012.

In 2013, Norwich City manager Chris Hughton confirmed in a press conference that the club had made an enquiry into his availability.

Loan to Melbourne Victory
On 24 September 2013, Troisi was loaned to Melbourne Victory on a one-year deal. He made his A-League debut against Melbourne Heart in Round 1 of the competition's ninth season. He scored his first goal for Melbourne in a 2–2 draw against Adelaide United.

His second goal for Melbourne was in front of the home fans at Etihad Stadium in a 1–0 win over Brisbane Roar on 25 October 2013, thanks to an Archie Thompson through ball pass. He scored two goals against Wellington Phoenix in a 3–2 win, and his fifth came from a free kick against Sydney FC in a 2–3 loss.

He scored 12 goals in the A-League and 3 in the Asian Champions League.

Juventus
On 20 June 2014, Juventus announced that they had secured full ownership of Troisi's contract from Atalanta for €1 million, with the remaining 50% registration rights of Prince-Désir Gouano moved to Atalanta also for €1 million.

Loan to Zulte Waregem
On 30 August 2014, Troisi joined Belgian Pro League club Zulte Waregem on a one-year deal, after being deemed surplus to requirements at Juventus.

Troisi featured in over twenty Pro League matches, scoring five goals in the process, including a memorable long range strike against Club Brugge, chipping his Socceroos teammate goalkeeper Mathew Ryan.

Loan to Ittihad
On 31 August 2015, Troisi was loaned to Saudi Arabian club Al-Ittihad.

However, his stay was cut short. Troisi subsequently terminated the contract. It was reported that Ittihad failed to pay the wage in time and the player lodged a claim with the FIFA Dispute Resolution Chamber, which was accepted. The further appeals of both the club and the player to the Court of Arbitration for Sport had confirmed the club had to pay Troisi the remaining wage.

Liaoning Hongyun
Despite reported interest from A-League clubs, including his hometown club Adelaide United and Melbourne Victory, on 29 January 2016, Troisi signed with Chinese Super League side Liaoning Whowin joining fellow countryman Michael Thwaite. Six months into his 11-month contract, following the signing of Dario Vidošić, Troisi was deemed unneeded at Liaoning Whowin and parted with the club.

Melbourne Victory
On 1 August 2016, after his release from Liaoning Whowin, Troisi returned to the A-League again, signing a one-year deal with Melbourne Victory. On 26 July 2017, James Troisi re-signed with Melbourne Victory for two years.

Adelaide United
After choosing not to re-sign with Melbourne Victory, on 5 October 2019, Troisi signed a two-year deal with his hometown club Adelaide United. Prior to the start of the 2020–21 A-League season Adelaide United gave Troisi permission to speak with other clubs. Bruce Djite, speaking for the club, claimed that following an improvement in the club's financial situation following other player sales, they notified Troisi that he is a required player and were therefore disappointed when Troisi requested to terminate his contract two weeks before the beginning of the season. Troisi later spoke out in the sports media to say he was not informed of that change in status. Following the disagreement, his playing contract was mutually terminated in December 2020, leaving him free to join a new club.

Western Sydney Wanderers
Following leaving Adelaide United, Troisi signed a two-year deal with Western Sydney Wanderers.

Western United
On 17 July 2022, Troisi signed a one-year deal with Western United.

International career

U23 

After a successful 2006–07 season with the Newcastle reserve side, Troisi made his debut for the Australia U23 team (the "Olyroos"), on 18 April 2007 against Saudi Arabia in an Olympic qualifier. He followed up a good performance against the Saudis with a goal in the all-important clash with Iran in his hometown of Adelaide.

Senior 
Troisi made his full international debut for Australia in a goalless friendly against Singapore on 22 March 2008, playing in left midfield.

Ange Postecoglou included Troisi in the Australia squad for the 2014 FIFA World Cup.

Troisi was named as part of Australia's 2015 AFC Asian Cup squad. He started Australia's first match of the tournament against Kuwait, scoring Australia's fourth and final goal of the match in the 92nd minute of the match, helping Australia to a 4–1 win. Troisi played for Australia in the 2015 AFC Asian Cup Final against South Korea, coming on as a second-half substitute for Robbie Kruse. He scored Australia's second goal of the match in the first period of extra time, the winning goal of the Asian Cup Final.

He was selected in Australia's squad for the 2017 FIFA Confederations Cup. He scored against Chile, and was awarded FIFA Man of the Match.

In May 2018, he was named in Australia's preliminary 26-man squad for the 2018 World Cup in Russia.

Career statistics

Club

International 
Scores and results list Australia's goal tally first.

Honours
Australia
 AFC Asian Cup: 2015

References

External links

 Gençlerbirliği profile
 Aussie Footballers Trajcevski to Trupkovic
 Oz Football profile
 TFF profile
 
 

1988 births
Australian soccer players
Australian people of Greek descent
Australia international soccer players
Association football forwards
Newcastle United F.C. players
Gençlerbirliği S.K. footballers
Kayserispor footballers
Atalanta B.C. players
Adelaide United FC players
Melbourne Victory FC players
Western Sydney Wanderers FC players
Western United FC players
S.V. Zulte Waregem players
Ittihad FC players
Liaoning F.C. players
Süper Lig players
Serie A players
A-League Men players
Belgian Pro League players
Saudi Professional League players
Chinese Super League players
Footballers at the 2008 Summer Olympics
Olympic soccer players of Australia
2014 FIFA World Cup players
2015 AFC Asian Cup players
2017 FIFA Confederations Cup players
Australian expatriate soccer players
Expatriate footballers in England
Expatriate footballers in Turkey
Expatriate footballers in Italy
Expatriate footballers in China
Australian expatriate sportspeople in China
Australian expatriate sportspeople in England
Australian expatriate sportspeople in Turkey
Soccer players from Adelaide
Living people
AFC Asian Cup-winning players
Marquee players (A-League Men)
Australian expatriate sportspeople in Saudi Arabia